The 1975 Stockholm Open was a combined men's and women's tennis tournament played on hard courts. The men's event was part of the 1975 Commercial Union Assurance Grand Prix, while the women's took part of the 1975 Virginia Slims WTA Tour and took place at the Kungliga tennishallen in Stockholm, Sweden. The men's tournament was held from 25 October through 6 November 1975 while the women's event took place from 31 October through 3 November. Adriano Panatta and Virginia Wade won the singles titles.

Finals

Men's singles

 Adriano Panatta defeated  Jimmy Connors 6–4, 6–3

Women's singles
 Virginia Wade defeated  Françoise Dürr 6–3, 4–6, 7–5

Men's doubles

 Bob Hewitt /  Frew McMillan defeated  Charlie Pasarell /  Roscoe Tanner 3–6, 6–3, 6–4

Women's doubles
 Françoise Dürr /  Betty Stöve defeated  Evonne Goolagong Cawley /  Virginia Wade 6–3, 6–4

References

External links
  
  
 Association of Tennis Professionals (ATP) tournament profile

Stockholm Open
Stockholm Open
Stockholm Open
1975 WTA Tour
Stock
October 1975 sports events in Europe
November 1975 sports events in Europe
1970s in Stockholm